This is a list of fellows of the Royal Society elected in 1706.

Fellows
 Philip Bisse (1677–1721)
 Charles Boyle, 4th Earl of Orrery (1674–1731)
 William Burnett (1688–1729)
 Willem Buys (1661–1749)
 Carron, Count of Briancon (d. 1709)
 William Cowper, 1st Earl Cowper (c. 1665–1723)
 James Douglas (1675–1742)
 Jean Christophe Fatio (d. 1720)
 Thomas Forster (fl. 1706–1727)
 Gallucci (fl. 1706)
 Samuel Garth (1661–1719)
 John Knight (c. 1687–1733)
 Giovanni Maria Lancisi (1654–1720)
 Francis Nicholson (1660–1728)
 Thomas Savery (c. 1650–1715)
 James Sherard (1666–1738)
 Robert Shippen (1675–1745)
 Charles Townshend, 2nd Viscount Townshend (1675–1738)
 Wilhelm Van Vrijberge (1656–1711)
 Humfrey Wanley (1672–1726)

References

1706
1706 in science
1706 in England